Barnet and Camden is a territorial constituency represented on the London Assembly by one assembly member (AM). The constituency was created in 2000 at the same time as the London Assembly and has elections every four years. It consists of the combined area of the London Borough of Barnet and the London Borough of Camden. The current assembly member is Anne Clarke of the Labour Party who was elected in 2021.

Constituency profile 
The constituency is a 'pie slice' pairing of the large Outer London borough of Barnet with the smaller Inner London borough of Camden. It stretches from Holborn in the south to the Greater London boundary in the north. It includes parts of central London, the inner city, suburban development and a semi-rural fringe.

The seat originally was a very marginal Conservative seat, being won by the party by less than 600 votes in 2000. The result was perhaps surprising as all of the area it covered, apart from the Chipping Barnet constituency, was represented by Labour MPs at the time.

It became reasonably safer in the 2004 and 2008 elections, but was lost to Labour on a swing of almost 12% in 2012.

Assembly members 
The constituency returns one assembly member and is one of fourteen territorial constituencies in London. Represented from its creation in 2000 until the 2012 election by Brian Coleman, a Conservative from Barnet, former Labour MP Andrew Dismore won it from him with a swing of nearly 12%. Dismore stepped down ahead of the 2021 election and was replaced by Anne Clarke, a Labour councillor in Barnet.

Mayoral election results 
Below are the results for the candidate which received the highest share of the popular vote in the constituency at each mayoral election.

Assembly election results

Overlapping constituencies
The constituency includes all of the following Westminster seats:

Chipping Barnet - Theresa Villiers (Conservative)
Finchley and Golders Green - Mike Freer (Conservative)
Hendon - Matthew Offord (Conservative)
Holborn and St. Pancras - Keir Starmer (Labour)

Barnet and Camden also includes part of the following constituency:
Hampstead and Kilburn - Tulip Siddiq (Labour)

References

London Assembly constituencies
Politics of the London Borough of Barnet
Politics of the London Borough of Camden
2000 establishments in England
Constituencies established in 2000